Dorothyann Nelson is a former American figure skater.  She skated with partner Pieter Kollen.  Together they were the champions in pair skating at the 1962 United States Figure Skating Championships and also won the silver medal in ice dance at the same event.  Nelson retired from competition in 1962 in order to skate professionally with Ice Follies.

Results
Pairs
(with Kollen)

Dance
(with Kollen)

References

American female pair skaters
American female ice dancers
Living people
Year of birth missing (living people)
Place of birth missing (living people)
21st-century American women